Sveinson is a surname, similar to Svensson. Notable people with the surname include:

 Ben Sveinson (born 1945), Canadian politician
 Bill Sveinson (1946–2020), Canadian poker player and politician
 Danny Sveinson (born 1991), Canadian guitarist

Patronymic surnames